The Lockheed Martin X-59 QueSST ("Quiet SuperSonic Technology") is an American experimental supersonic aircraft being developed at Skunk Works for NASA's Low-Boom Flight Demonstrator project. Preliminary design started in February 2016, with the X-59 to be delivered to NASA in 2021 for flight testing in 2023.

Development 

In February 2016, Lockheed Martin was awarded a preliminary design contract, aiming to fly in the 2020 timeframe.

A 9% scale model was to be wind tunnel tested from Mach 0.3 to Mach 1.6 between February and April 2017.
The preliminary design review was to be completed by June 2017.
While NASA received three inquiries for its August 2017 request for proposals, Lockheed was the sole bidder.

On April 2, 2018, NASA awarded Lockheed Martin a $247.5 million contract to design, build and deliver in late 2021 the Low-Boom X-plane.
On June 26, 2018, the US Air Force informed NASA it had assigned the X-59 QueSST designation to the demonstrator.
By October, NASA Langley had completed three weeks of wind tunnel testing of an 8%-scale model, with high AOAs up to 50° and 88° at very low speed, up from 13° in previous tunnel campaigns.
Testing was for static stability and control, dynamic forced oscillations, and laser flow visualization, expanding on previous experimental and computational predictions.

From November 5, 2018, NASA was to begin tests over two weeks to gather feedback: up to eight thumps a day at different locations to be monitored by 20 noise sensors and described by 400 residents, receiving a $25 per week compensation.
By then, Lockheed Martin had begun machining the first part in Palmdale, California.

In May 2019, the initial major structural parts were loaded in the tooling assembly.
In June, assembly was getting underway.
The external vision system (XVS) was flight tested on a King Air at NASA Langley.
This will be followed by high speed wind tunnel tests to verify inlet performance predictions with a 9.5%-scale model at NASA Glenn Research Center.
The critical design review was successfully held on September 9–13, before the  report to NASA's Integrated Aviation Systems Program by November. Then, 80–90% of the drawings should be released to engineering.
The wing assembly was to be completed in 2020.
In December 2020, construction was halfway completed, and first flight was then planned for 2022.

After flight-clearance testing at the Armstrong Flight Research Center, an acoustic validation will include air-to-air Schlieren imaging backlit by the Sun to confirm the shockwave pattern until September 2022.
NASA will conduct flight tests over U.S. cities to verify the safety and performance of the X-59's quiet supersonic technologies and evaluate community responses for regulators, which could enable commercial supersonic travel over land.

Community-response flight tests starting in 2023–2025 will be used for ICAO's Committee on Aviation Environmental Protection meeting (CAEP13) establishing a sonic boom standard. The results of the community overflights will be delivered to the ICAO and the FAA in 2027, allowing for a decision to be made to revise the rules on commercial supersonic travel over land in 2028.

NASA reported the installation of the General Electric F-414-GE-100 engine on the X-59, which took place at Lockheed Martin's Skunk Works in Palmdale, California early November 2022. As of November 2022 the X-59's first flight is planned for 2023.

Design 

The cockpit, ejection seat and canopy come from a Northrop T-38 and the landing gear from an F-16. With afterburner its engine will provide  of thrust.

The ground noise is expected to be around 60 dB(A), about 1/1000 as loud as current supersonic aircraft. This is achieved by using a long, narrow airframe and canards to keep the shock waves from coalescing.
It should create a 75 Perceived Level decibel (PLdB) thump on ground, as loud as closing a car door, compared with 105-110 PLdB for the Concorde. 
The central engine has a top-mounted intake for low boom, but inlet flow distortion due to vortices is a concern.

The flush cockpit means that the long and pointed nose-cone will obstruct all forward vision. The X-59 will use an enhanced flight vision system (EVS), consisting of a forward 4K camera with a 33° by 19° angle of view, which will compensate for the lack of forward visibility.

United Technologies subsidiary Collins Aerospace was selected to supply its Pro Line Fusion Cockpit avionics, displaying the boom on the ground, and EVS with long-wave infrared sensors.
The Collins EVS-3600 multispectral imaging system, beneath the nose, is used for landing, while the NASA external vision system (XVS), in front of the cockpit, is giving a forward view.

See also

References

External links

 
 

QueSST
NASA programs
Proposed aircraft of the United States
Supersonic transports